Sir Timothy Augustine Coghlan  (9 June 1856 – 30 April 1926) was an Australian statistician, engineer, economic historian and diplomat. He held the post of New South Wales government statistician for 19 years, and served various periods as Agent-General for New South Wales in London from 1905 to his death in 1926.

Early life
Coghlan was born in Sydney, the second son of Thomas Coghlan of Irish Roman Catholic extraction. He was educated at Cleveland Street Public School and Sydney Grammar School, and in 1873 joined the public works department, becoming assistant-engineer of harbours and rivers in 1884.

Statistical career
When the New South Wales department of statistics was created, Coghlan was appointed government statistician and began his duties early in 1886. The appointment was much criticized, but Coghlan held the position for 19 years and showed great industry and ability. He published in 1887 the first issue of The Wealth and Progress of New South Wales which continued to appear almost at yearly intervals.

Other work
Coghlan was also registrar of Friendly Societies from 1892 to 1905, a member of the public service board from 1896 to 1900, chairman of board of old age pensions 1901-5, and was president of the economics and statistics section at the 1902 meeting of the Australasian Association for the Advancement of Science.

In December 1905, Coghlan was offered the chance to become the inaugural Commonwealth Statistician, heading the newly created Commonwealth Bureau of Census and Statistics. In February 1906, he informed Prime Minister Alfred Deakin that he could not accept the offer due to his obligations to the Premier of New South Wales, Joseph Carruthers. He later told Deakin that Carruthers had threatened to withdraw his pension entitlements if he accepted the federal position.

In 1905 Coghlan was appointed Agent-General for the state of New South Wales at London and held the position until his death apart from three short breaks. Coghlan was well qualified for this role and to deal with the many loans floated in London. Coghlan also promoted emigration to Australia. 

On 15 December 1914, Banjo Paterson reports he was in London when he,

He published in 1918, in four volumes, Labour and Industry in Australia from the first Settlement in 1788 to the Establishment of the Commonwealth in 1901. It has been said of this work, 

Coghlan was serving as Agent-General when he died suddenly at London on 30 April 1926. His funeral was held at St Mary's, Cadogan Street, with his remains placed at Kensal Green Cemetery.

In 1897 he married Helen Donnelly (d. 1936), the daughter of Denis Donnelly, who survived him with a son, Arthur, and a daughter, Ellen. Coghlan left them an estate of the value of £43,197. Coghlan was awarded the Imperial Service Order (ISO) in 1903, was knighted in 1914 and created a Knight Commander of the Order of St Michael and St George (KCMG) in 1918.

References

External links

1856 births
1926 deaths
Australian people of Irish descent
Australian statisticians
Australian engineers
Australian Knights Bachelor
Australian Knights Commander of the Order of St Michael and St George
Engineers from Sydney
Burials at Kensal Green Cemetery
Agents-General for New South Wales
Australian Companions of the Imperial Service Order
Public servants of New South Wales
People educated at Sydney Grammar School
Fellows of the Royal Statistical Society
19th-century Australian public servants
Australian historians
Australian economists